The National Reverse Mortgage Lenders Association (NRMLA) is a U.S. trade organization for financial institutions involved in the origination and securitization of reverse mortgages, provides lobbying efforts on behalf of its member institutions. Founded in 1997 and headquartered in Washington, D.C., NRMLA hosts industry conferences, provides lobbying efforts on behalf of its member institutions, compiles and publishes data on reverse mortgage sales, and provides marketing outreach relating to reverse mortgage issues.

References

External links
 National Reverse Mortgage Lenders Association

Trade associations based in the United States
Mortgage industry companies of the United States
Mortgage industry associations